In Town Tonight is a 1935 British musical film directed by Herbert Smith and starring Jack Barty, Dave Apollon and Billy Merrin. It was made by British Lion at Beaconsfield Studios.

The film's art direction was by Andrew Mazzei.

Cast
 Jack Barty as The Agent  
 Dave Apollon as Himself
 Billy Merrin as Himself  
 Howard Jacobs as Himself 
 The Kneller Hall Military Band as Themselves  
 Stanley Holloway as Himself  
 Three Radio Rogues as Themselves  
 Wilson Keppel and Betty as Themselves  
 Arthur Prince as Himself 
 Olive Groves as Herself  
 The Carson Sisters as Themselves  
 Nora Williams as Herself  
 Finlay Currie as The Manager  
 Melissa Mason as Herself  
 Gilbert Russell as Himself  
 Tessa Deane as Herself  
 The Dynamites as Themselves 
 The Seven Thunderbolts as Themselves  
 Beryl Orde as Herself  
 Robert Lively as Himself 
 Robert Rietty as Boy

References

Bibliography
 Low, Rachael. Filmmaking in 1930s Britain. George Allen & Unwin, 1985.
 Wood, Linda. British Films, 1927-1939. British Film Institute, 1986.

External links

1935 films
British musical films
1935 musical films
Films shot at Beaconsfield Studios
Films set in England
Films directed by Herbert Smith
British black-and-white films
1930s English-language films
1930s British films